Out of the Chorus is a lost 1921 American silent drama film starring Alice Brady and directed by Herbert Blache. It was produced and distributed by Paramount offshoot Realart Pictures.

Plot
As described in a summary in a film publication, chorus girl Florence Maddis (Brady) marries Ross Van Beekman (Steele), a son in an aristocratic family. His mother Mrs. Van Beekman (Fitzroy) is determined to turn Ross against his wife, and plots with Ned Ormsby, who wants Florence for himself. Mrs. Van Beekman contrives to have Ned and Florence thrown together often until Ross begins to doubt his wife. Ross sets a trap for her, and on his return finds evidence that Ned was also there, but the wife is an innocent victim of the scheme. Ross shoots through a door behind which he believes Ned is hiding and when Ned is later mysteriously murdered in his home, Ross believes that he is the killer. Florence, to save her husband's life, lies when testifying at trial and says that Ned was shot while he was with her. The truth and Ross' innocence are finally established, and Florence's actions win the love and esteem of Ross and his family.

Cast
Alice Brady - Florence Maddis
Vernon Steele - Ross Van Beekman
Charles K. Gerrard - Ned Ormsby
Emily Fitzroy - Mrs. Van Beekman
Edith Stockton - Fola
Richard Carlyle - Maddox
Constance Berry - Margaret Van Beekman
Ben Probst - Feinstein

See also
Provocation (legal)

References

External links

Lantern slide; Out of the Chorus

1921 films
American silent feature films
Lost American films
Films directed by Herbert Blaché
American black-and-white films
Silent American drama films
1921 drama films
1921 lost films
Lost drama films
1920s American films